Nathan Shaham (Hebrew: נתן שחם; January 29, 1925 – June 18, 2018) was an Israeli writer.

Biography 
Born in Tel Aviv, Shaham was a member of Kibbutz Beit Alfa from 1945-2018, and served with the Palmach in the 1948 Arab-Israeli War. He was the son of Eliezer Steinman, the Hebrew author and essayist.

Shaham was editor-in-chief of Sifriat Poalim Publishing House. He was Israel's cultural attaché in the United States from 1977–80, and a former vice-chairman of the Israel Broadcasting Authority.

He died in his home in Beit Alfa on June 18, 2018.

Awards
Shaham was the winner of several literary awards, including the Bialik Prize (1988), the National Jewish Book Award for Fiction for Rosendorf Quartet (1992), the Newman Prize (1993), the ADAI-WIZO Prize for The Rosendorf Quartet (Italy, 2005), and the Prime Minister's Prize (2007).

In 2012, he won the Israel Prize for Hebrew Literature and Poetry; the prize jury called Shaham one of the outstanding authors of Israel’s generation of founders and noted the “lively and rich” style of his plays, fiction and nonfiction works.

Works
 Grain and Lead (novel), Sifriat Poalim, 1948 [Dagan Ve-Oferet]
 The Gods Are Lazy (novel), Sifriat Poalim, 1949 [Ha-Elim Atzelim]
 They'll Arrive Tomorrow (play), Sifriat Poalim, 1949 [Hem Yagyu Mahar]
 Call Me Siomka (play), Sifriat Poalim, 1950 [Kra Li Siomka]
 "Yohanan Bar Hama" (play), 1952
 Always Us (novel), Sifriat Poalim, 1952 [Tamid Anahnu]
 A Stone on the Well's Mouth (novel), Sifriat Poalim, 1956 [Even Al Pi Ha-Be'er]
 "Meetings in Moscow" (non-fiction), 1957
 Veterans' Housing (stories), Sifriat Poalim, 1958 [Shikun Vatikim]
 The Wisdom of the Poor (novel), Sifriat Poalim, 1960 [Hochmat Ha-Misken]
 Citrus Scent (novel), Sifriat Poalim, 1962 [Reyah Hadarim]
 The Journey to the Land of Kush (travel), Massada, 1962 [Masah Le-Eretz Kush]
 "That's Because" (children), Sifriat Poalim, 1964
 The Book of Portraits, Sifriat Poalim, 1968 [Sefer ha-Diokanaot]
 First Person Plural (novel), Sifriat Poalim, 1968 [Guf Rishon Rabim]
 Round Trip (novel), Am Oved, 1972 [Haloch Ve-Shov]
 Witness for the King (novel), Am Oved, 1975 [Ed Ha-Melech]
 Talk to the Wind (novel), Sifriat Poalim, 1975 [Daber El Ha-Ruah]
 The Other Side of the Wall (novellas), Am Oved, 1978 [Kirot Etz Dakim]
 Green Autumn (stories), Sifriat Poalim, 1979 [Stav Yarok]
 Bone to the Bone (novel), Am Oved, 1981 [Etzem El Atzmo]
 Still Silent Voice (novel), Sifriat Poalim, 1983 [Demamah Dakah]
 Mountain and Home (non-fiction), Sifriat Poalim, 1984 [Ha-Har Ve Ha-Bayit]
 The Streets of Ashkelon (novellas), Am Oved, 1985 [Hutzot Ashkelon]
 Four in One Bar, Hakibbutz Hameuchad, 1987 [Arba Be-Teivah Ahat]
 The Rosendorf Quartet (novel), Am Oved, 1987 [Reviyat Rosendorf]. English translation Avalon Travel Publishing, 2000, 
 Sealed Book, Sifriat Poalim, 1988 [Sefer Hatum]
 They'll Arrive Tomorrow (play), Or-Am, 1989 [Hem Yagyu Mahar]
 New Account (play), Or-Am, 1989 [Heshbon Hadash]
 The Desert Generation (non-fiction), Sifriat Poalim, 1991 [Dor Ha-Midbar]
 Series (novel), Am Oved, 1992 [Sidra]
 Hot Dogs (stories), Sifriat Poalim, 1993 [Naknikiot Hamot]
 The Heart of Tel Aviv (novel), Am Oved, 1996 [Lev Tel Aviv]
 Expect a Letter (stories), Sifriat Poalim, 1999 [Michtav Ba-Derech]
 Rosendorf's Shadow (novel), Am Oved, 2001 [Tzilo Shel Rosendorf]
 Tabula Rasa [Zmora-Bitan, 2010]

References

External links
Biography, Hebrew at Stanford

See also
List of Bialik Prize recipients

1925 births
2018 deaths
Modern Hebrew writers
Israeli Jews
Israeli people of Ukrainian-Jewish descent
Kibbutzniks
Israeli novelists
Israeli male short story writers
Israeli short story writers
Israeli male dramatists and playwrights
Recipients of Prime Minister's Prize for Hebrew Literary Works